Unexpected Places is a 1918 American silent comedy-drama film directed by E. Mason Hopper and starring Bert Lytell, Rhea Mitchell, and Rosemary Theby. It was released on September 30, 1918.

Cast list
 Bert Lytell as Dick Holloway
 Rhea Mitchell as Ruth Penfield
 Rosemary Theby as Cherie
 Colin Kenny as Lord Harold Varden
 Louis Morrison as Hiram Penfield
 Edythe Chapman as Mrs. Penfield
 John Burton as Jocelyn
 Stanton Heck as Brauer
 Jay Dwiggins as Meyer
 Frank Newberry
 Martin Best

References

External links 
 
 
 

Films directed by E. Mason Hopper
Metro Pictures films
American silent feature films
American black-and-white films
1918 comedy-drama films
1918 films
1910s American films
Silent American comedy-drama films
1910s English-language films